The 2014–15 Segunda División season (known as the Liga Adelante for sponsorship reasons) is the 84th since its establishment. The campaign began on 23 August 2014 and the league phase of 42 rounds ended on 7 June 2015. The entire season ended on 21 June 2015 with the promotion play-off finals.

Teams

Promotion and relegation (pre-season)
A total of 22 teams will contest the league, including 15 sides from the 2013–14 season, four promoted from the 2013–14 Segunda División B and three relegated from the 2013–14 La Liga.

Teams relegated from the 2013–14 La Liga
 Osasuna
 Real Valladolid
 Real Betis 

Teams promoted from the 2013–14 Segunda División B
Racing de Santander (Immediate return) 
Albacete (After 3 years)
Llagostera (Debut season)
Leganés (After 10 years)

Murcia and Racing case

Due to their financial problems, Murcia and Racing de Santander were threatened with being relegated to the Segunda División B. On 1 August 2014, LaLiga published an official statement announcing that Murcia was not able to be registered in the league, while Racing had five days to present the additional economic-financial information requested by the association.

On 7 August, LaLiga decided to relegate Murcia to the Segunda División B, whereby Mirandés remained in the Segunda despite being in a relegation position.

On 13 August, despite LaLiga being forced to re-admit Murcia and suspending its relegation to Segunda División B, the League announced in a new statement that it could not allow Murcia to play in the Segunda and, the next day, suspended the start of the championship.

A new judgement confirmed the relegation of Murcia and the Segunda started with Mirandés completing the 22 teams.

Stadia and locations 

Notes
 Note 1: Llagostera will play their home matches at Estadi Palamós Costa Brava, Palamós as their own Estadi Municipal did not meet LFP criteria. It was initially planned for the club to play at Estadi Montilivi, Girona, but Girona FC rejected to share its stadium.

Personnel and sponsorship

Managerial changes

League table

Positions by round

Results

Promotion play-offs

Teams in position 3-6 at the end of the regular season will compete in a play-off for one place in 2015–16 La Liga.

Semi-finals

First leg

Second leg

Final

First leg

Second leg

Season statistics

Top goalscorers

Zamora Trophy
The Zamora Trophy is awarded by newspaper Marca to the goalkeeper with least goals-to-games ratio. Keepers must play at least 28 games of 60 or more minutes to be eligible for the trophy.

In the table, only goalkeepers with at least the 75% of the games played are included.

Hat-tricks

Attendances
Attendances include playoff games.

Awards

Number of teams by autonomous community

See also
 List of Spanish football transfers summer 2014
 2014–15 La Liga
 2014–15 Segunda División B
 2014–15 Copa del Rey

References 

 
2014-15
2

Spain